Yushui is a town under the administration of Dushan County, Guizhou, China. , it has 6 villages under its administration.

References 

Township-level divisions of Guizhou
Dushan County